Anharibag, also spelled Anharibagh, is a village in Jagdishpur block of Bhojpur district in Bihar, India. As of 2011, its population was 1,287, in 213 households. It is located just north of the city of Jagdishpur.

References 

Villages in Bhojpur district, India